Chris Cummins may refer to:

 Christopher C. Cummins, American chemist
 Chris Cummins (football coach) (born 1972), former head coach of Toronto F.C.
 Chris Cummins (politician) (born 1962), former Labor member of the Queensland Legislative Assembly

See also
 Chris Cummings (born 1975), musician